Ivanacara are a genus of cichlid fishes from tropical South America. This genus was identified as a new in 2006, but many authorities do not recognize it and maintain its species in Nannacara.

Species
 Ivanacara adoketa (Kullander & Prada-Pedreros, 1993) – Zebra acara
 Ivanacara bimaculata (Eigenmann, 1912)

Nannacara adoketa and Nannacara bimaculata were reassigned to the new genus Ivanacara. This change has not been recognized by FishBase, but it has been adopted by the Catalog of Fishes.

References

 
Cichlasomatini